Babak Jahanbakhsh (born 21 March 1983) is an Iranian pop singer.

Biography 
Born in Bochum, Germany, Jahanbakhsh started playing the piano at the age of five under the supervision of a German teacher at the Free Music School in Bochum. After finishing his father's education and returning to Iran, he became more interested in music and pursued Oriental music more seriously. The first person to encourage him to become a singer was the old composer Mojtaba Mirzadeh.  He underwent new training courses and in 1997, at the age of 14, he received his official license from the Islamic Republic of Iran Broadcasting, which at that time was approved by Mohammad Ali Moallem, and in the same year he recorded a track for the Islamic Republic of Iran Broadcasting.

Discography

Albums 
Production of his first album began in 2003, and in 2005 he released the album "Chi Shodeh", and in the same year he was selected as the second phenomenon of the year. He entered a new phase of his artistic career with the release of the album Mano Baroon. The song "Mano Baroon" from this album has been sung with Reza Sadeghi. This song became the 13th in the list of the top 100 songs of 2012 on Radio Javan.
 Chi Shodeh (Late December 2005)

 Bi Esm (12 November 2008)

 Ehsas (20 June 2010)

 Zendegie Man (7 June 2011)

 Mano Baroon (11 July 2012)

 Oxygen (13 August 2013)

 Madare Bigharari (14 September 2014)

 Halam Khobeh (11 May 2016)

Singles 
 These songs have entered the music market since 2005:

Composing for others 
Babak Jahanbakhsh has passed the basics of composition and arrangement and theoretical music courses under the supervision of great music masters such as Morteza Delshad, Mojtaba Mirzadeh, Masoud Mirdamadi and others and has successfully completed them.  Some of the songs that he has composed and arranged are:

Concerts 
Babak Jahanbakhsh has a history of attending the Fajr International Music Festival.

In the 5th Moghavemat Music Festival on 14 August 2013, Babak Jahanbakhsh performed with 4 other singers.  The song "Jadeye Eshgh" was composed by Mohsen Shirali and was performed for the first time in this festival.  Also, the songs "Mano Baroon" and "Darya", which were among the best works of Babak Jahanbakhsh, were performed in this festival.

References

External links 
 
 
 All music Babak Jahanbakhsh

1983 births
Living people
People from Bochum
Iranian composers
Iranian pop singers
21st-century Iranian male singers
Iranian singer-songwriters